Bazyar Kheyl (also Romanized as Bāzyār Kheyl; also known as Bāzār Kheyl and Bāzbār Kheyl) is a village in Kuhdasht-e Gharbi Rural District, in the Central District of Miandorud County, Mazandaran Province, Iran. At the 2006 census, its population was 80, in 24 families.

References 

Populated places in Miandorud County